Basildon is the largest town in the borough of Basildon, within the county of Essex, England. It had a recorded population of 107,123. In 1931, the town had a population of 1,159.

Nearby towns include Billericay to the north-west, Wickford to the north-east and South Benfleet to the south-east. It was created as a new town after World War II in 1948, to accommodate the London population overspill from the conglomeration of four small villages, namely Pitsea, Laindon, Basildon (the most central of the four) and Vange.

The local government district of Basildon, which was formed in 1974 and received borough status in 2010, encapsulates a larger area than the town itself; the two neighbouring towns of Billericay and Wickford, as well as rural villages and smaller settlements set among the surrounding countryside, fall within its borders. Basildon Town is one of the most densely populated areas in the county. The parish of Basildon was abolished to create Billericay on 1 January 1937.

Some of Basildon's residents work in Central London, due to the town being well connected in the county to the City of London and the Docklands financial and corporate headquarters districts, with a 36–58 minute journey from the three Basildon stations on the C2c to London Fenchurch Street. Basildon also has access to the City via road, on the A127 and A13.

History

The first historical reference to Basildon is in records from 1086. It is mentioned in the Domesday Book as 'Belesduna'. The name 'Basildon' may be derived from the Anglo-Saxon personal name 'Boerthal' and the Anglo-Saxon word 'dun', meaning hill. In historical documents, this name had various forms over the centuries, including Berdlesdon, Batlesdon and Belesduna.

Railway service started in the 19th century to Pitsea (1856) and Laindon (1888) but it was only later that proposals to provide service to the new town of Basildon, shelved for many years because of concerns that it would simply become a commuter suburb of London, were eventually forced through. A significant number of modern-day residents do commute to London.

By the beginning of the 1900s, Basildon had evolved with much of the land having been sold in small plots during a period of land speculation and development taking placed haphazardly with building by plot owners ranging from shelters created from recycled materials to brick-built homes and with amenities such as water, gas, electricity and hard-surfaced roads lacking.

In the 1940s, Billericay Urban District Council and Essex County Council, concerned by lack of amenities in the area and by its development, petitioned the Government to create a New Town. Basildon was one of eight 'New Towns' created in the South East of England after the passing of the New Towns Act. On 4 January 1949 Lewis Silkin, Minister of Town and Country Planning, officially designated Basildon as a 'New Town'. Basildon Development Corporation was formed in February 1949 to transform the designated area into a modern new town. The New Town incorporated Laindon and Pitsea and was laid out around small neighbourhoods with the first house being completed in June 1951. The masterplan was published in 1951, with the landscaping proposed by Sylvia Crowe with open space and playing fields distributed throughout the developed area to preserve the best landscape features. The first tenants moved into homes in Redgrave Road in Vange. The Basildon Centre, which incorporates the local council offices, was officially opened by Jack Cunningham on 14 November 1989.

Since March 2010 Basildon has a miniature famous white Hollywood sign, reading "Basildon": at five feet tall, the new sign is one-ninth of the height of the Hollywood original. part of a plan of landscaping and infrastructure improvements funded by £400,000 from the Prescott-spearheaded Thames Gateway.  Opponents from all parties believe spending could have been directed toward social problems.

Politics

The former constituency of Basildon was considered a barometer of public opinion in general elections. The results of the constituency elections were the same as the overall result of general elections from 1983 to its abolition in 2010. Basildon was said to epitomise the working class conversion to Thatcherism during the 1980s, though the town did not vote Conservative in 1979; nor did the Conservative Party ever hold an absolute majority in the town – its success was due to the split between the SDP and the Labour Party. "Basildon Man" or "Essex Man" was coined to describe an aspirational working class voter.

Boundary changes, which came into force from the 2010 general election, mean that the area is politically represented by two MPs, from the constituencies of Basildon and Billericay and South Basildon and East Thurrock. The current MPs are John Baron and Stephen Metcalfe, both of the Conservative party.

In terms of local politics, Basildon District elects five councillors to Essex County Council. Following the 2017 election, the seats were split: 2 to the Conservatives, 2 to Labour and 1 Independent. Noak Bridge has a parish council.

Communities
Basildon was built like many new towns with each area being a planned community. These communities are now the local areas of the town:

 Pitsea - one of the original four villages that were incorporated into the new town. Pitsea itself is split into 7 distinct communities - Pitsea, Pitsea Mount, Eversley, Chalvedon, Northlands (formerly Felmores), Burnt Mills and Nevendon.
 Laindon - one of the original four villages that were incorporated into the new town.
 Vange - one of the original four villages that were incorporated into the new town.
 Fryerns - an area of Basildon which is located along Whitmore Way. The name came from a nearby farm (reputedly the first farm compulsory purchased by the Basildon Development Corporation) and was formerly the home of Fryerns Comprehensive School.
 Craylands - an area between Fryerns and Pitsea, and was named after the former Craylands County Secondary School. The area is under redevelopment by Swan Housing and has been renamed by them as Beechwood Village.
 Barstable - an area situated along Timberlog Lane. The area is named after the former Barstable Hundred and known for its local shopping parade Stacey's Corner. It was formerly home to both Barstable School and Timberlog Secondary School with the former being now part of the Basildon Academies.
 Kingswood - an area situated at the west end of Clay Hill Road.
 Ghyllgrove - an area situated between the Town centre and Fryerns.
 Lee Chapel South - an area situated between the Town centre and Basildon University Hospital.
 Lee Chapel North - an area situated between Gloucester Park, Lee Chapel South and Laindon
 Langdon Hills - an area situated south of Laindon.
 Dry Street - a small hamlet situated just south of Laindon and west of Vange.
 Great Berry - declared a village by Essex County Council in 2015, the area is situated west of Laindon.
 Noak Bridge - an area just north of Pipps Hill and east of Steeple View.
 Steeple View - an area just north of Laindon and West of Noak Bridge. It is so named because the steeples of Great Burstead Church, St. Mary the Virgin Church and St Nicholas Church, Basildon are visible from the area.
 Pipps Hill - an industrial area just north of Gloucester Park  and west of Cranes.
 Cranes - an industrial area east of Pipps Hill. The name comes from the former Cranes Farm which stood on the site.

Industry
Basildon has a heavily developed industrial base. During the construction of the New Town, government grants were given to companies to set up their businesses in Basildon. Amongst the companies that took up these grants were Ford Motor Company (opened 1964), Carreras Tobacco Company (1959–1984), Yardley of London (1966–1998), Gordon's Gin (1984–1998) and GEC-Marconi (now home to Leonardo MW).

Basildon has industrial areas situated in Laindon, Cranes Farm Road and Burnt Mills. Cranes Farm Road is currently home to CNH Tractor Plant, formerly owned by Ford. Argos opened a regional warehouse on Pipps Hill Industrial Estate in the 1990s. In 2015, an Amazon delivery base was opened in Christopher Martin Road.

A datacentre hosting the European matching engine of the Intercontinental Exchange is located in Gardiners Lane, Basildon on the site of the former York International factory.

In 2017, Costa Coffee opened their new coffee roastery in Basildon. It is said to be Europe's biggest coffee roastery – quadrupling Costa's roasting capacity from 11,000 tonnes per year to 45,000 tonnes. The facility, which is dubbed "Paradise Street", can handle around 24 tonnes of coffee beans per hour.

Transport

Road

The two main roads from London to Southend, the A13 and A127, pass to the south and north of the town respectively. Both are important commuter trunk roads, allowing easy access to the M25 and the rest of the motorway network. Locally, the A13 gives access to Pitsea and Vange; the A127 gives access to the town centre and Laindon.

Within the town are six main roads which link to and from the A13 and A127; all of them include the word 'Mayne' in their names.

 Nether Mayne runs from the town centre to the A13 at Five Bells junction, just west of Vange.
 Upper Mayne runs from the town centre to the A127 in the north-east corner of Laindon. Both this road and Nether Mayne form part of the A176, which continues north to Billericay.
 South Mayne runs from Northlands Park to the A13 at Pitsea.
 East Mayne runs from Northlands Park to the A127 near Noke Wood. Both this road and South Mayne form part of the A132, which continues north to Wickford.
 Broadmayne runs from the town centre to Northlands Park, connecting the four aforementioned roads. It forms the A1321.
 West Mayne runs from the centre of Laindon to the A127 at Dunton Wayletts. It forms part of the B148, which continues east from Laindon to Upper Mayne.

Rail
The town has three stations on the London, Tilbury and Southend line: Pitsea, Basildon and Laindon. All are served by c2c trains running between Fenchurch Street and Southend/Shoeburyness; trains serving Basildon and Laindon stations run via Upminster.

Bus
Most bus services are provided by First Essex which connect Basildon to Billericay, Wickford and other nearby towns. Other providers are Stephensons of Essex and NIBS Buses.

Major transport investments

A127, Basildon Enterprise Corridor

As part of Basildon's redevelopment Essex County Council had proposed that the A127 undergo significant development at a cost of £15 million, which was expected to be finished by March 2011. It was funded via the Community Infrastructure Fund (CIF). The project was completed and was divided into three sections:
 Section 1 – Eastmayne. Implementation of an additional lane northbound (600 metres approx.) and new drainage and footpath realignment.
 Section 2 – Cranes Farm Road. Included dualling of the existing carriageway of which was already there (approx. 1500m) and enhancing and upgrading junctions – with the creation of a dedicated left turn lane at the roundabout at Eastmayne to help ease traffic flows during busy hours at the junction.
 Section 3 – Introduction of a new A176 junction at Pipps Hill. This included upgrading the east and westbound off slips to increase the capacity of vehicles and ease traffic flows. The implementation of queue detection and advanced warning signs was also added to this section of the road. Part of section 3 also saw the introduction of the new Hollywood sign for Basildon at the A176 junction.

Education

There are several secondary schools in the Basildon district:

 Basildon Academies
 De La Salle School
 James Hornsby School
 Woodlands School

Basildon also has two FE colleges:

South Essex College which is located in the town centre. It was originally located at Nethermayne (formerly Thurrock and Basildon College) near Basildon University Hospital.
PROCAT – an engineering and construction FE college (formerly Prospects College) based at Pipps Hill.

New Campus Basildon – formerly part of SEEVIC and was based in Church Walk. It was announced in January 2017 that the college would be closing from September 2017.

Essex County Council's Adult Community Learning service, ACL is based at Ely House, Churchill Avenue, while there are several private providers delivering apprenticeship, traineeship and business training.

Sport
Basildon has four senior men's football clubs: Bowers & Pitsea F.C. play in the Isthmian League Premier, while Hashtag United F.C. and Basildon United play in the Isthmian League North Division; and Basildon Town, who play in the Essex Olympian Football League. Basildon also has a senior ladies team, Hashtag United Women F.C. (formerly AFC Basildon), who play in the National League Southern Premier.

In rugby, the town is represented in the London 2 North East League by Basildon R.F.C., while there is only local cricket played at Basildon and Pitsea C.C. in the Shepherd Neame Essex League Division 3. Basildon is home to the South Essex Gymnastics Club, where Olympic champion Max Whitlock trains.

The town's main sporting facility is the Basildon Sporting Village, that opened in 2011 and is based in Gloucester Park. The Village consists of an Olympic-sized swimming pool, 8 court sports hall, a climbing wall, athletics track and is home to the South Essex Gymnastics Club. It was revealed in 2014 that more people swim in Basildon than anywhere else in the county and that 3.5 million people had visited the centre since it had opened. There are also smaller leisure centres, named The Place and Eversley Centre, located in Pitsea which opened during the 1980s.

Basildon golf course is based in the Kingswood district of the town.

Entertainment and culture

Shopping

The town centre has a variety of high street stores. As well as shops and coffee houses in the open air East Walk and Town Square, there is the covered Eastgate Shopping Centre which is home to over 100 retailers.

When Eastgate was completed in 1985, it was the largest covered shopping centre in Europe until the opening of the Metro Centre. Eastgate has undergone a number of facelifts since 1985, with its most recent substantial refurbishment in 2007 at a cost of more than £10m.

Further shopping facilities in the town can be found at Westgate Shopping Park, while there is a pavement market selling fresh fruit and vegetables as well as household goods, which in 2018 moved to a new location in St. Martins Square.

Outside of the town centre there are retail parks at Pipps Hill and Mayflower on the A127, while there are smaller shopping centres in Laindon and Pitsea, which is home to a famous market that opened in the 1920s. There are several smaller shopping areas
located in each of the communities.

Festival Leisure Park

Festival Leisure Park is a trading leisure park located in the north of Basildon and owned by Aviva. The Festival Leisure Park, includes 15 restaurants, a bowling and arcade centre, a family and entertainment centre with play frame and dodgem car track, two hotels, a bar, a sixteen screen Cineworld cinema, two health clubs and a nightclub called Unit 7. The Festival Leisure Park is colloquially known as "Bas Vegas". The name originated from a proposed Casino development on the site. The site was previously home to the Aquatels park which hosted a zoo, ski slope and golf range that opened in 1972, which was replaced in 1982 by a conference venue called the Festival Hall which was home to the MFI World Matchplay darts championship.

A wakeboarding complex also opened in 2012, attracting both professionals and amateurs alike

Theatre
The Arts Centre was the first theatre in Basildon, opening in 1968 in a temporary facility behind the then temporary council offices, on the site of the current Westgate shopping park. This was renamed 'The Towngate Theatre and Arts Centre' in 1976, before being replaced by a new purpose built theatre as part of the new Basildon Centre, on the opposite side for the former Towngate Road.

In 1989, the culture and history of the town was documented by the newly re-opened Towngate Theatre, when it commissioned a community play from Arnold Wesker for the town's 40th anniversary. The potted history that Wesker called "Boerthel's Hill" was acted out by a 125 members of the community recording a fascinating history of London's East Enders, who were the first Basildon residents.

Cinema
Basildon currently has one cinema, Cineworld, which is located at the Festival Leisure Park. This was previously owned by Empire Cinemas but was purchased as part of $124m deal to purchase 5 cinemas. It had opened originally as a UCI.

Previously, Basildon had an ABC Cinema, which was built in 1971 and was based in North Gunnells. This changed hands several times becoming a Cannon and a Robins cinema before closing in 1999. The building until August 2022 was home to the British Heart Foundation store. Prior to this, a cinema in Pitsea, originally called The Broadway from 1930, before changing its name in 1955 as The Century, operated until its closure in 1966 when it was converted to a Bingo hall.

In 2018, planning permission was granted for a new ten screen Empire cinema, along with new restaurants on the site of Freedom House in Basildon town centre, with demolition of the current buildings on site starting in 2019. As of January 2023, the partially completed cinema has not opened.

Libraries and museums
Basildon Central Library is now based in the Basildon Centre (since 1989), but had previously been in prefabs next to the temporary council offices on Fodderwick. There are also numerous smaller libraries across Basildon: Clay Hill Road in Vange, Pitsea Centre in Pitsea, Fryerns Library in Whitmore Way, and Laindon Library on New Century Road Laindon.

Basildon is home to the Haven Plotlands Museum and was previously home to the National Motorboat Museum, which had been based at Wat Tyler Park. Currently there is not a museum dedicated to the history of Basildon, though plans had previously been made to site one at Wat Tyler Park. As of 2018 there is still a campaign to have a museum created.

Parks and recreations grounds

Basildon was designed with large amounts of green spaces with Gloucester Park dominating the centre of Basildon. Kent View Recreation ground in Vange and Northlands Park in Pitsea are the other large green spaces. Other formal parks include Mopsies Park in Timberlog Lane, and Howards Park in Pitsea.

Basildon is also home to Wat Tyler Country Park which opened in 1984; Marks Hill Nature Reserve (opened 1981); Vange Hill; One Tree Hill Country Park; Langdon Hill Country Parks and the RSPB Nature Reserve at Bowers Marshes. Essex Wildlife Trust run a large reserve at Langdon.

Heritage
Even though Basildon is a new town, there are still traces of its historical past visible. Old roads that once connected the villages have been incorporated into the new town: Clay Hill Road, Timberlog Lane, Rectory Road, Pound Lane, Church Road and Dry Street. Dry Street is a perfect example of old Basildon, as it is an undeveloped country lane that runs through One Tree Hill and Langdon Hill Country Parks and is home to several listed properties.

Other than St Martin's Church, most of the historical parish churches still exist. St Nicholas (13th century and Grade 1 listed) sits proudly over Laindon, from where Basildon can be seen clearly, however St Peter's (13th century Grade II* listed) at Nevendon is hidden behind Sainsbury's and is little known by its residents. St Michael's at Pitsea is said to be 13th century, but was rebuilt in 1870 and now only its Bell Tower remains on Pitsea Mount. The village of Basildon's parish church, Holy Cross (Grade II listed) can still be seen in Church Road, while Vange's 14th-century church All Saints was remodelled in the 19th century and is set back from the London Road and is Grade II listed.

Other buildings of note are: the Barge Inn at Vange; the Broadway at Pitsea, with its mock Tudor architecture built by Harold Howard in 1929; Cromwell Manor, formerly Pitsea Hall Grade II listed, by Pitsea railway station that dates from the 15th century; and Great Chalvedon Hall, Grade II listed and now a pub in Tyefields, which is reputed to date from the 16th century. Nevendon Hall was built in 1789 and is Grade II listed. The moat at the former site of Boetlers, a Tudor house demolished in the 1960s, is located near to Holy Cross Church.

One notable building is Little Coopers Farmhouse, which was originally located in Takeley. It was designated a Grade II building in 1980. In the late 1980s, due to redevelopment, the whole structure was dismantled and re-built at the Wat Tyler Country Park.

On the west side of town, the Dunton Plotlands area was occupied by small rural dwellings in the mid twentieth century. Today, it forms Langdon Nature Reserve.

In 2008, a National Lottery funded heritage trail was started to highlight the 1960s architecture.

Media
Basildon has its own community radio station, which is aimed towards the residents of Basildon, East Thurrock and its surrounding areas called Gateway 97.8 which broadcasts from the Eastgate Shopping Centre.

BBC London and ITV London are the local television regions received in the town. Basildon Development Corporation had installed a Cable Television service into many of its home, called Rediffusion, but this service stopped during the 1990s. The service was replaced by United Artists Cable which were based in the town; this is now Virgin Media, although the customer service operation closed in the 2000s.

Since 1969, The Evening Echo newspaper offices have been based on the Pipps Hill Industrial Estate. The town has been home to The Yellow Advertiser since 1976.

Television
Basildon was the setting for the BBC programme White Gold with filming taking place in Basildon Town Centre. Channel 5 programme Extreme Hair Wars was set at JET training academy in Basildon. The fictional character Nellie Bertram, played by Catherine Tate in the U.S. comedy television series The Office was said to have been born in Basildon.

Music
Basildon had a great influence on the 1980s music scene with bands Depeche Mode and Yazoo, and later by Alison Moyet in her solo career and Vince Clarke in his role with Erasure.

Film
The documentary film New Town Utopia by Christopher Ian Smith was made about Basildon. Basildon also hosts Europe's only Underwater film studio that can be inside or out, as it has a removable roof. The studios have been used to film scenes in the Anglo-French drama The Tunnel and for the film 47 Meters Down.

Art
Basildon was the focus of Magic Party Place by photographer CJ Clarke. " a largely white working class community, the town is one of the most statistically average places in England", he said.

Poetry & Literature 
Caron Freeborn, (previously Severn),  (1966-2019) author, poet & performer grew up in Basildon and attended Fryerns Comprehensive. Later she attended Lucy Cavendish college at Cambridge as a mature student, then as a teacher/ lecturer in creative writing including poetry. Freeborn obtained her Masters Degree in Renaissance literature. She published three novels: Three Blind Mice (2001), described by Marian Keyes as ‘a dark and compelling love story of a genre that could be called East End noir’; Prohibitions (2004), a literary thriller again set in the East End; and Presenting … the Fabulous O’Learys (2017), a bold and imaginative take on King Lear, updated to the 1980s. Georges Perec is my hero (2015) showcased Freeborn’s innovative and compelling poetic voice(s). Much of Georges Perec is my hero celebrates the real, the brutal, (including embracing the brutalist architecture of Basildon) with many poems and photographs based in the town.

Modern architecture and design

St. Martin's Church in Basildon town centre is a modern structure. The church was consecrated in 1962 by the Bishop of Chelmsford.  A freestanding glass Bell Tower was built in 1999 and opened by Her Majesty the Queen.

Although there are a number of tall buildings in central Basildon, there are also many newly constructed buildings closer to the 'Basildon Enterprise Corridor' situated in North Basildon.

The largest structure in the new town's town centre is Brooke House, a 14-story residential tower block that fronts the west side of the town centre's East Square. Dating from 1962, it was designed by Sir Basil Spence and Anthony B Davies, with Ove Arup and Partners as the structural engineers. It has a 1960s Brutalist design, elevated on 8 massive V-shaped concrete pylons. The building was chosen to have a residential function, as opposed to commercial office space, to retain life in the town centre after the shops had closed. Shops were positioned to the rear of the building, with Brooke House acting as a covered forecourt. It was conceived as a structure to define Basildon's urban status and to act as marker to identify the town centre's location within a largely low-rise settlement set in a flat landscape. It was named after the then Minister of Housing and Local Government, Henry Brooke MP. The building was given Grade II listing in 1998.

East of Brooke House is East Square, a sunken open-air public plaza accessed from Brooke House by a monumental staircase and a curved ramp which was listed in 1998 as Grade II.  Formerly the east side of the square was fronted by Freedom House, containing shops on two levels, and the north side by the Post Office building, a 5-story structure. Formerly on the wall of Freedom House is the oldest piece of public sculpture in the new town: installed in 1957, it is a wire and aluminium relief by the sculptor A. J. Poole titled "Man Aspires". The whole ensemble was designed to create a formal setting for Brooke House, and had a similar Brutalist design, though softened by other architectural features. Freedom House was demolished, along with the Post Office building as part of the new cinema construction in 2019. The town centre extends from East Square towards the south-west. Down the middle of this zone runs a rectangular raised pool. Within the pool is a bronze sculpture and fountain, titled "Mother and Child", by the sculptor Maurice Lambert and dating from 1959 which was listed as Grade II in 1998.

On the Upper level of Eastgate is the Cats Cradle Pussiwillow III Clock. It was created by Rowland Emett in 1981 and was originally placed outside what is now ASDA on the Lower Mall of the shopping centre. It was officially unveiled by Michael Bentine.

The Barstable School building first opened on 1 March 1962 and was designed by the Finnish architect Cyril Leonard Sjöström Mardall (of YRM Architects, Yorke, Rosenberg and Mardall). The building was listed in 1993 and is Grade II listed. It is now home to the lower school of the Basildon Academies.

Regeneration
Basildon has gone through several regenerations - a few highlights are:.

Investment in the Basildon Enterprise Corridor, a large business area.
The creation of a new wetland nature reserve in the Thames Marshes by the Royal Society for the Protection of Birds (RSPB), the Land Restoration Trust, Basildon District Council and Veolia.
A review of the district's housing, with investment in housing estates such as Craylands, Five Links and Felmores which will be re-designed to allow for less trouble and having more streets with roads, rather than a street with just pavement.
The regeneration of Pitsea town centre.

Some future plans include:

The regeneration of Basildon and Laindon town centres.
The creation of a health and education research centre near Basildon University Hospital.
There is a proposal for creating Dunton Garden Suburb on land between Basildon and Brentwood. This proposal may have 6,000 homes, together with retail, commercial and leisure uses. This is a joint proposal of the two councils and a public consultation ended in March 2015. The proposal has been met with criticism from all political parties and the residents group Residents Against Inappropriate Development
In 2018 planning permission was granted for a new 10 screen Empire Cinema along with new restaurants on the site of Freedom House in Basildon town centre.

Twinning
Basildon's twin towns include:

  Heiligenhaus (Germany)
  Meaux (France)

Healthcare

Notable people

 Perry Bamonte – ex-guitarist, The Cure
 Andy Barcham – footballer
 Jay Howard - Racecar Driver
 Brian Belo – winner of Big Brother 2007
 Stuart Bingham – former World champion snooker player.
 Emma Blackery – singer-songwriter and YouTuber
 Daniel Brooks golfer on the European Tour
 Darren Caskey – ex-Tottenham Hotspur F.C. and Reading F.C. footballer
 Keith Chapman – creator of Bob The Builder
 Mark Crick – photographer and author
 Depeche Mode – electronic music band, formed in 1980 in Basildon.
 Martin Gore
 Andrew Fletcher
 David Gahan
 Vince Clarke – currently a member of Erasure
 Bob Downs – former professional cyclist
 Josh Dubovie – singer, Eurovision Song Contest 2010 in Oslo, Norway
 Justin Edinburgh – ex-Tottenham Hotspur F.C. Portsmouth F.C. and Southend United F.C.
 Sophie Hinchliffe - cleaning  
 Michael Kightly – footballer, Wolverhampton Wanderers, Southend United and Grays Athletic
 Kunt and the Gang - musical comedian
 Robert Marlow – singer
 Terry Marsh – boxer
 Eamonn Martin – Athlete and winner of the 1993 London Marathon elite men's race.
 Alison Moyet – singer
 QBoy – rapper
 Gemma Ray – musician, singer, composer and producer
 Scott Robinson, singer from Five
 Simon Segars – CEO ARM Holdings, born in Basildon, went to Woodlands School
 Joan Sims – actress
 Ellie Taylor - British comedian
 Kara Tointon – actress, Dawn Swann in EastEnders and film The Football Factory
 James Tomkins – footballer, West Ham United FC
 Denise Van Outen – actress
 Vincent O'Connell - Playwright, Film maker

Climate
Climate in this area has mild differences between highs and lows, and there is adequate rainfall year-round.  The Köppen Climate Classification subtype for this climate is "Cfb" (Marine West Coast Climate/Oceanic climate).

See also 
 New Holland Agriculture

References

External links

 Basildon Council
 Basildon Heritage
 Basildon Borough History – Basildon
 Basildon History Online
 Gateway 97.8 – Community Radio station
 Basildon Radio – Basildon local Internet Radio station
 

 
Towns in Essex
New towns started in the 1940s
Unparished areas in Essex
Former civil parishes in Essex
Borough of Basildon